Rongxing Garden Park (also called Rongxing Garden or Rongxing Park) is an urban park in Zhongshan District, Taipei, Taiwan.

History
The park was built in 1990. It is managed by Yuanshan Park Management Division.

Geology
The park is the first European landscape garden in Taipei, which consists of flowers, wetlands, lotus ponds and children playground. It spans over an area of 6.5 hectares.

Transportation
The park is accessible within walking distance North West from Zhongshan Junior High School Station of Taipei Metro.

See also
 List of parks in Taiwan
 List of tourist attractions in Taiwan

References

External link

1990 establishments in Taiwan
Parks established in 1990
Parks in Taipei